A luxury magazine is a printed or online magazine marketed to the ultra-affluent that feature high-value products like sports cars, jewelry, mechanical watches, real estate, yachts, private jets and exotic vacations. Nationally, magazines such as Robb Report primarily offer advertisements for expensive goods. In many expensive markets, local titles exist to target the affluent.   

There are also many online magazines publishers including  Modern Luxury and Niche Media .

References 

 Luxury
Magazine genres